The Queens Royals men's basketball team represents the Queens University of Charlotte in Charlotte, North Carolina, United States. The Royals joined the NCAA Division I ASUN Conference on July 1, 2022 after nine seasons in the Division II South Atlantic Conference. Due to the NCAA's policy on reclassifying programs, the Royals will not be eligible to compete in the NCAA tournament or the NIT until the 2026–27 season.

The team, currently led by first-year head coach Grant Leonard, plays its home games at Curry Arena.

History
Queens fielded its first men's basketball team in the 1989-90 season; Dale Layer was the team's first head coach.

Postseason results

NCAA Division II Tournament results
The Royals appeared in the NCAA Division II tournament fifteen times. Their combined record was 21–14.

See also
Queens Royals women's basketball

References

External links